In Lie theory, an area of mathematics, the Kazhdan–Margulis theorem is a statement asserting that a discrete subgroup in semisimple Lie groups cannot be too dense in the group. More precisely, in any such Lie group there is a uniform neighbourhood of the identity element such that every lattice in the group has a conjugate whose intersection with this neighbourhood contains only the identity. This result was proven in the sixties by David Kazhdan and Grigory Margulis.

Statement and remarks 

The formal statement of the Kazhdan–Margulis theorem is as follows.

Let  be a semisimple Lie group: there exists an open neighbourhood  of the identity  in  such that for any discrete subgroup  there is an element  satisfying . 

Proof 

The main technical result of Kazhdan–Margulis, which is interesting in its own right and from which the better-known statement above follows immediately, is the following.

The neighbourhood  is obtained as a Zassenhaus neighbourhood of the identity in : the theorem then follows by standard Lie-theoretic arguments.

There also exist other proofs. There is one proof which is more geometric in nature and which can give more information, and there is a third proof, relying on the notion of invariant random subgroups, which is considerably shorter.

Applications

Selberg's hypothesis 

One of the motivations of Kazhdan–Margulis was to prove the following statement, known at the time as Selberg's hypothesis (recall that a lattice is called uniform if its quotient space is compact):

A lattice in a semisimple Lie group is non-uniform if and only if it contains a unipotent element. 

This result follows from the more technical version of the Kazhdan–Margulis theorem and the fact that only unipotent elements can be conjugated arbitrarily close (for a given element) to the identity.

Volumes of locally symmetric spaces 

A corollary of the theorem is that the locally symmetric spaces and orbifolds associated to lattices in a semisimple Lie group cannot have arbitrarily small volume (given a normalisation for the Haar measure).

For hyperbolic three-manifolds the lattice of minimal volume is known and its covolume is about 0.0390. In higher dimensions the problem of finding the lattice of minimal volume is still open, though it has been solved when restricting to the subclass of arithmetic groups.

Wang's finiteness theorem 

Together with local rigidity and finite generation of lattices the Kazhdan-Margulis theorem is an important ingredient in the proof of Wang's finiteness theorem.

See also 

Margulis lemma

Notes

References 

Algebraic groups
Geometric group theory
Lie groups